Ballylongford GAA is a Gaelic Athletic Association club from the village of Ballylongford in County Kerry, Ireland. They have won 14 North Kerry Senior Football Championships.

Honours
North Kerry Senior Football Championship: 14
1940, 1941, 1942, 1943, 1947, 1953, 1968, 1970, 1971, 1974, 1975, 1986, 1993, 2000
Kerry Intermediate Football Championship: 3
1971, 1976, 1977

Notable players
 Kieran Culhane
 Paddy Kelly
 John Kennedy
 Éamonn O'Donoghue
 Paudie O'Donoghue
 Jackie Walsh

References

Gaelic games clubs in County Kerry
Gaelic football clubs in County Kerry